Aliabiev may refer to:

 Alexander Alyabyev, Russian-Empire composer
 Anatoly Alyabyev, Soviet athlete
 Viacheslav Aliabiev, Ukrainian soccer player
 Victor Ivanovich Alyabyev, Soviet scientist